Port Hope (Millson Field) Aerodrome  is an aerodrome located  west northwest of Port Hope, Ontario, Canada.

References

Registered aerodromes in Ontario
Buildings and structures in Northumberland County, Ontario